Willum Þór Willumsson (born 23 October 1998) is an Icelandic professional footballer who plays as a midfielder for Eredivisie club Go Ahead Eagles and the Iceland national team.

Career
Willum signed with BATE Borisov in February 2019. In February 2022, he signed a six-month extension with the club.

International career
Willum made his debut for the Iceland national team on 15 January 2019 in a friendly against Estonia, coming on as a 69th-minute substitute for Jón Dagur Þorsteinsson.

Personal life
Willum is the son of Willum Þór Þórsson, a former football player and manager, current member of the Icelandic parliament and Minister of Health since 2021. He is the brother of fellow footballer Brynjólfur Willumsson, who plays for Kristiansund.

References

External links
 
 

Willumsson, Willum Thor
Willumsson, Willum Thor
Icelandic footballers
Iceland youth international footballers
Iceland under-21 international footballers
Iceland international footballers
Icelandic expatriate footballers
Willumsson, Willum Thor
Icelandic expatriate sportspeople in Belarus
Willumsson, Willum Thor
Icelandic expatriate sportspeople in the Netherlands
Úrvalsdeild karla (football) players
Association football midfielders
Breiðablik UBK players
Willumsson, Willum Thor
Willumsson, Willum Thor